San José is a small town where the weather is usually hot.  It is a municipality in the Escuintla department of Guatemala. The municipal seat is the port city of Puerto San José the old port. The municipality also contains Puerto Quetzal, Guatemala's main Pacific Ocean port.

Municipalities of the Escuintla Department